Martin Tenk (born 8 February 1972 in Ostrava) is a Czech sports shooter and Olympic medalist. He won a bronze medal in the 50 metre pistol at the 2000 Summer Olympics in Sydney. He also competed at the 1996, 2004 and 2008 Summer Olympics.

References

External links

1972 births
Living people
Czech male sport shooters
Shooters at the 1996 Summer Olympics
Shooters at the 2000 Summer Olympics
Shooters at the 2004 Summer Olympics
Shooters at the 2008 Summer Olympics
Olympic shooters of the Czech Republic
Olympic bronze medalists for the Czech Republic
Sportspeople from Ostrava
Olympic medalists in shooting
Medalists at the 2000 Summer Olympics